The 1950 All England Championships was a badminton tournament held at the Empress Hall, Earls Court, London, England, from 1–4 March 1950.

Final results

Men's singles

Section 1

Section 2

+ denotes seed

Women's singles

Section 1

Section 2

References

All England Open Badminton Championships
All England Badminton Championships
All England Open Badminton Championships in London
All England Championships
All England Badminton Championships
All England Badminton Championships